The Le Blon was a French automobile

Le Blon may also refer to:
Hubert Le Blon (1874–1910), French automobilist and pioneer aviator
Jacob Christoph Le Blon (1667–1741), painter and engraver from Frankfurt
Pierre le Blon, Belgian fencer

See also
Blon (disambiguation)
Franz von Blon, German composer and bandmaster